Beet Soil-Borne Mosaic Virus (BSBMV) is a plant pathogenic virus. It is a mosaic virus and a soil borne pathogen affecting beetroot.

External links
 Family Groups - The Baltimore Method

Viral plant pathogens and diseases
Benyviruses